Siorapaluk (West Greenlandic) or Hiurapaluk (Polar Inuit) is a settlement in the Qaanaaq area of the Avannaata municipality in northern Greenland. It is one of the world's northernmost inhabited settlements, the northernmost settlement inhabited by natives, and the northernmost public settlement in Greenland. It has a population of 43 who speak the Inuktun language of the Polar Inuit as well as the Kalaallisut dialect of Greenlandic. Many of the inhabitants are direct descendants of the last migration of Inuit from Canada in the 20th century.

Geography
Siorapaluk is located in the northern shore of the Siorapaluup Kangerlua (Robertson Fjord).

Hunting
There is good hunting in the area of the settlement, and the cliffs around it function as breeding grounds for dovekie (UK English: little auk) (Alle alle) and the thick-billed murre (UK English: Brünnich's guillemot) (Uria lomvia). There are many Arctic foxes and Arctic hares in the area and an abundance of seals and walruses which are hunted.

Infrastructure
Siorapaluk has an electrical power plant, direct satellite radio and TV-broadcasting, a well stocked store and telephone service.  The settlement's school is combined with its church and a small public library.  Although there are no resident medical facilities, the settlement is visited regularly by a physician and a dentist.

Transport

Air Greenland operates settlement flights to Qaanaaq Airport and to Savissivik Heliport via Thule Air Base. The distance to Qaanaaq is 45 km. The twice-weekly flights are subsidized by the Government of Greenland. Transfers at the airbase are subject to access restrictions by the Danish Foreign Ministry.

Population

References

Populated places in Greenland
Populated places of Arctic Greenland